This is a list of broadcast television stations serving cities in the Canadian province of Quebec. Digital channels as of November 2011.

Defunct stations
Channel 30: CFVO-TV - TVA - Hull

See also
Media in Canada
Ottawa-licensed stations in the list of television stations in Ontario; the majority of these transmit from Ryan Tower at Camp Fortune, Quebec.
List of television stations in Canada

References

Quebec

Television stations